Talia Folino (born 18 May 2001) is an Australian artistic gymnast. In 2018, she won the gold medal in the women's balance beam event at the 2018 Pacific Rim Gymnastics Championships held in Medellín, Colombia. She represented Australia at the 2017 and 2019 World Championships. She competes for the LIU Sharks in NCAA gymnastics.

References

External links 
 

Living people
2001 births
Sportspeople from Melbourne
Australian female artistic gymnasts
21st-century Australian women